Victor Vargas (born 28 March 1952) is a Venezuelan banker and businessman, best known for being the owner and president of the 14th largest private bank in Venezuela, Banco Occidental de Descuento.

Early life
Victor Vargas was born into a middle class family in the municipality of Chacao, city of Caracas, Venezuela. His mother was the first woman to serve on the Supreme Court of Venezuela. His father was a doctor. He earned his law degree at Andrés Bello Catholic University.

Career
Vargas started his career as a lawyer.

In the 1980s, he acquired 2% of CapitalBanc Corp., a bank based in New York City. The bank was closed down in the early 1990s after authorities discovered fraud involving Vargas. He was charged and accused of fraud. He is quoted describing the venture as "the worst business" of his life. He shared his experience in October 2007 when he moderated a panel on corporate governance at a Miami conference of the Florida International Bankers Association and the Latin American Banks Federation.

In 1992 he sold a small bank he founded and owned. He used those funds a year later, in 1993, to buy Banco Occidental de Descuento, based in the oil-rich state of Zulia. Many of his clients are oil investors. Another form of revenue comes from purchasing sovereign debt bonds and re-selling them for profit to investors. As of 2015, it was the 14th largest private bank in Venezuela. He serves as its Vice-President.

Economic alliances
In 2014, Vargas and BOD partnered with American Express to provide a new credit product for microentrepreneurs. Microentrepreneurs provide for 15 percent of the Venezuelan economy.

Vargas and BOD’s goal was to expand the American Express card to 300,000 cardholders with access to 46,000 businesses by 2013. The card would offer a 4-year rotating term financing option.

National financial leadership
In 2010, overall profitability on bank assets in Venezuela fell to 9.7 percent from 20.5 percent in 2009. Venezuelan bankers were concerned that the Venezuelan Central Bank had not changed commission tariffs in over five years. Vargas served as the leader of the National Bank Board and led discussions with the Superintendencia de Bancos. Vargas proposed that the Central Bank create new requirements for giving loans to strategic sectors as opposed to the then-current law requiring compulsory loan portfolios.

Relations with Bolivarian government 

Vargas and his bank were not successful before Chavez became president of Venezuela. He later helped the Chávez administration raise funds to finance Venezuela's budget. According to the United States Department of State, Vargas was "said to have made a profit off those negotiations" and was described as "a banker whose star has risen greatly during the Chávez presidency". Vargas is alleged to have made background deals with the Chávez government, those close to Vargas denied that he had received special treatment from Chávez.

In 2008, Vargas' bank, Banco Occidental de Descuento (BOD), agreed to buy Banco de Venezuela from its then-owner, Spanish bank Banco Santander. Vargas and his bank officials met with the appropriate finance officials in the Venezuelan government, and the officials approved the purchase. Vargas's BOD then put a $700 million down payment toward the purchase.  Soon after, President Hugo Chavez went on national TV and announced he was pushing BOD aside and buying the bank himself, on behalf of the Venezuelan government. BOD lost the $700 million deposit. Banco Santander refused to refund it. A Spanish court ordered the refund, but Spain's equivalent of the Supreme Court overturned that order. Through it all, a 2008 Wall Street Journal article characterized Vargas and Venezuela's other wealthy elites as having "durability...no matter who is in power." Vargas was later assisted by the Venezuelan government for abiding by their policies during the Venezuelan banking crisis of 2009–10, when more than a half-dozen competing private banking institutions were closed.

Vargas's survival strategy, he says, is to remain "agnostic about politics": "A businessman has to deal with his government, no matter how far to the right or left it is".

In May 2013, it was alleged that Vargas purchased Cadena Capriles, with its criticism of the Venezuelan government declining afterward.

BOD Financial Group
Vargas owns BOD Financial Group (Spanish: Grupo Financiero BOD), an umbrella company that owns Vargas's businesses. BOD Financial owns companies in three major market sectors: banking, capital markets, and insurance.

Philanthropy and civic activities
In 2011, Vargas launched the Entrepreneur Program, a non-profit organization that helps people start small businesses. The program targets entrepreneurs who are not able to get funding from traditional banking sources. In its first phase in July 2011, the program selected and trained 100 entrepreneurs. The program provides funding for cultural and educational initiatives targeted at disadvantaged communities. Since 2002, the program has invested $20 million in these initiatives. For example, the program funded the National Youth Orchestra of Chacao, which is conducted by the famous maestro José Antonio Abreu.

As head of the Banking Association of Venezuela, Vargas helped initiate an energy-saving programmed called “Efficient Consumption.” The program calls for companies to install renewable energy technologies at their headquarters buildings. Vargas called on private banks to take charge on spreading the word of the program.

The Enclave Foundation runs a free "Music for All" program that teaches music to over 6,000 public school children. Music for All has run for over 20 years. Children in grades kindergarten through grade school can participate.

Help the Lake" provides resources to study and protect Lake Maracaibo.

Awards
On June 23, 2015, Vargas was named "Latin America Entrepreneur of the Year" by business magazine The Executive. Concepción Dancausa, one of Spain's delegates to the European Union’s Committee of the Regions, personally gave the award to Vargas at a ceremony in Marid. According to Latin Business Daily, Vargas received the award "for his leadership role in driving economic growth, job creation, and expansion of wealth in Latin America."

Polo

Vargas co-owns and plays left bench for Lechuza Caracas, a polo club and team.

On September 1, 2015, Vargas told The Telegraph that he was planning to start a league in the Dominican Republic. Recently, Vargas had moved the headquarters of his club from England to Spain. When asked why, he explained the decision was simple: the rain. "We've played for five weeks here in Spain and had no rain."

On June 21, 2009, twenty-one of his horses died suddenly during a polo tournament in Palm Beach, Florida. The Lechuza Argentine captain, Juan Martín Nero believed the cause to be tainted Biodyl, a vitamin supplement given to horses to ward off exhaustion, as five of the horses that did not receive it were unaffected. Lechuza was runner-up in the 2009 CV Whitney Cup and won the Cup in 2011.

Personal life 
He was married to Carmen Leonor Santaella Tellería, with whom he had two daughters and one son:

 María Victoria Vargas (born 1979). She is married to Francisco D'Agostino, a businessman.
 Víctor José Vargas (1980–1999). He died in 1999 following complications from an infection.
 María Margarita Vargas (born 1983). She is married to Louis Alphonse, Duke of Anjou.

They divorced in 2002. Vargas remarried to María Beatriz Hernández later that year. They have two children:

 Víctor Simón Vargas (born 2012)
 María Guadalupe Vargas (born 2015). She was born prematurely in a Florida hospital and placed under observation, but was later released.

He owns two houses. One of his houses is in Caracas; another one is in La Guaira. In 2009, he purchased George Lindemann's mansion in Palm Beach, Florida for US$5.7 million. He also owns a plane and a 40' sailboat named "El Gran Guizo". He flies his own Cessna Citation 500.

References

External links 
 'La Serenísima' mortificación de Víctor Vargas - Armando.info, 19 December 2021
 Personal website (Spanish)
 Personal website (English)

Living people
People from Caracas
People from Palm Beach, Florida
20th-century Venezuelan lawyers
Venezuelan bankers
Venezuelan polo players
Venezuelan billionaires
1952 births